JKT Basketball Club, also known as JKT Mgulami, is a Tanzanian basketball club from Dar es Salaam. The team plays in the National Basketball League. 

In 2020, the team played in the qualifiers for the 2020 BAL season where it hosted Group D of the group phase in Dar es Salaam.

Honours
Tanzanian National League
Winners (1) 2003
Runners-up (2): 2001, 2010

In African competitions
BAL Qualifiers (1 appearance)
2020 – First Round

Players

Current roster

References

Basketball teams in Tanzania
Road to BAL teams
Sport in Dar es Salaam